Billy McConnell (born 19 April 1956) is a former field hockey player from Northern Ireland who represented both Ireland and Great Britain at international level. He represented Great Britain at the 1984 Summer Olympics when they won the bronze medal. He also represented Ireland at the 1990 Men's Hockey World Cup.

Domestic teams
McConnell played club field hockey for Newry Olympic,
Belfast YMCA
and Holywood 87.

International

Ireland
McConnell was a member of the Ireland team that were silver medallists at the 1978 EuroHockey Junior Championship. Other members of the team included Martin Sloan, Jimmy Kirkwood and Stephen Martin. He made his senior Ireland debut in 1979 against the Netherlands. He subsequently represented Ireland at the 1990 Men's Hockey World Cup. In 2010 he was inducted into the Irish Hockey Association Hall of Fame.

Great Britain
McConnell represented Great Britain at the 1984 Summer Olympics. McConnell also represented Great Britain in Champions Trophy tournaments, winning a bronze medal in 1984 and a silver in 1985.

Later years
Between 2007 and 2010 McConnell coached Pegasus. At the time, the Pegasus squad included his daughter, Kate McConnell. Kate was an Ireland women's field hockey international and in 2010–11 was a member of the Pegasus team that won a Women's Irish Hockey League/Irish Senior Cup. She also captained Pegasus. Billy McConnell has also coached at Queen's University.

References

External links
 

1956 births
Living people
Male field hockey players from Northern Ireland
Irish male field hockey players
Ireland international men's field hockey players
Irish field hockey coaches
British male field hockey players
Olympic bronze medallists for Great Britain
Olympic medalists in field hockey
Field hockey players at the 1984 Summer Olympics
Medalists at the 1984 Summer Olympics
1990 Men's Hockey World Cup players
Male field hockey defenders
Sportspeople from Newry